John XII Yeshu was the Patriarch of Antioch, and head of the Syriac Orthodox Church from 1208 until his death in 1220.

Biography
Yeshu, son of a priest called John, was born in the 12th century. He became a monk at the Monastery of the Akhsnoye (Stranger Ascetics) on the Sacred Mountain of Edessa where he became known for his asceticism. Yeshu was elevated to priesthood before 1191 and later moved to the Shiro Monastery to study Syriac and calligraphy.

During his time at the monastery he transcribed many manuscripts in Estrangelo of which his manuscripts of the Gospels can be found in Paris and the Edessene Library in Aleppo. Yeshu also wrote poems and liturgy leading him to gain the title of Yeshu the Scribe and he was also known as the Short One in relation to his height.

Yeshu was ordained patriarch on 31 August 1208 and upon which he took the name John and was frequently referred to as John the Stranger Scribe (Syriac:Yuhanon Akhsnoyo Kothubo), referring to his stay at the Monastery of the Stranger Ascetics. John appointed Ignatius David as Maphrian of the East in 1215. John administered the Syriac Orthodox Church for 12 years until his death in 1220.

References

Syriac Patriarchs of Antioch from 512 to 1783
13th-century Syriac Orthodox Church bishops
Year of birth unknown
Syriac writers
Syrian archbishops
12th-century births
13th-century Oriental Orthodox archbishops